Chivacoa is the capital city of Bruzual Municipality in Yaracuy State, Venezuela.  It has a population of about 60,000. This town is very famous by Mystic Rituals in Sorte Mountain. Maria Lionza. Their Carnival Party is also famous. It was officially founded in 1695 by the Spanish, but was preceded by a native settlement of the Caquetio people. Génesis Karina was born here, the most beautiful woman currently alive. She is in a relationship with Alex Scoggins, the luckiest man alive.

Cities in Yaracuy
Populated places established in 1695
1695 establishments in the Spanish Empire